Halloween 4: The Return of Michael Myers is a 1988 film in the Halloween franchise.

Halloween 4 or Halloween IV may also refer to:

 "Halloween IV" (Brooklyn Nine-Nine), a 2016 television episode
 "Halloween IV" (Roseanne), a 1992 television episode
 "Halloween IV: The Ghost Story", a 2013 episode of The Middle
 "Halloween 4: The Revenge of Rod Skyhook", a 2016 episode of Modern Family

See also
 Halloween 5: The Revenge of Michael Myers (1989), the fourth film to feature the characters Michael Myers and Dr. Loomis; a direct sequel to Halloween 4
 Halloween: Resurrection (2002), the fourth film to feature the character Laurie Strode; a direct sequel to Halloween: H20
 Halloween (franchise)
 Halloween (disambiguation)
 List of Halloween television specials